Lake Kaiavere is a lake of Estonia.

See also
List of lakes of Estonia

Kaiavere
Tartu Parish
Kaiavere